Kingston upon Hull has had many prominent and notable persons of Jewish descent. Although probably never more than 1% of the area population, by the end of the twentieth century the Jews of Hull made a notable contribution to the life of the city, and to the broader world. Among the sons and daughters of the Jews of Hull (as well as many Lord Mayors and Sheriffs of Hull) were three Fellows of the Royal Society, the founder of the world's largest furniture maker, numerous doctors and lawyers, as well as actress Dame Maureen Lipman.

Civic leaders 
(for Jewish communal founders, leaders, Rabbis etc, see History of Jews in Kingston upon Hull)

“It is doubtful if any other city can equal the record of Hull in the number of Jewish citizens who have filled the highest civic offices”, – Arthur Tidman, editor of the Hull Daily Mail, and later The Times. 

As listed here, Jews were elected Sheriff eleven times, and Mayor or Lord Mayor of Hull thirteen times, drawn from less than one percent of the Hull area's population (see History of Jews in Kingston upon Hull#Demography).

1850–1940 
Various Acts of Parliament gave Jews Emancipation, allowing them municipal office from 1845, such that Bethel Jacobs was a Town Councillor in Hull 1848–52 (see History of Jews in Kingston upon Hull#Early history).

Nevertheless, the first two mayors of apparently Jewish background were converts. William Henry Moss was Mayor in 1856 and 1862, the subject of anti-Jewish jibes. In 1863 he was widely praised for gifting to the town a Carrara marble statue of Queen Victoria; and he pressed for a free town library. Moss founded a firm of solicitors, was legal advisor to the dock company, and business partner to shipbuilder Martin Samuelson.

Convert Martin Samuelson, a major shipbuilder, was a Magistrate, Town Councillor in 1853, Sheriff in 1857 and Mayor of Hull in 1858. See History of Jews in Kingston upon Hull#Businesses.

John Symons, silversmith, was a Town Councillor by 1863 and Deputy Governor of the Hull Board of Guardians, an Alderman in 1873, and Sheriff for 1890; a local historian, antiquarian writer and lecturer, (and source of discredited accounts of a 17th-century Jewish presence in Hull), he was a founder of the Humber Masonic Lodge, and an Odd Fellow lodge. Simeon Mosely was also a Councillor in the 1860s; Solomon Cohen in 1873 became Town Councillor and an Alderman in 1903 (see History of Jews in Kingston upon Hull#Early history).

In the Edwardian era, merchant Victor Dumoulin was in 1902 Sheriff of Hull, as was his son Edward for 1910. Wool merchant Edward Gosschalk became Sheriff in 1905; The learned Henry Feldman (1855–1915), wool merchant, chief magistrate, and synagogue president, was elected Mayor of the City three times, spanning years, 1906–9.

Solicitor and mason Benno Pearlman was Lord Mayor in 1928, walking to his inauguration on the Sabbath; and Sheriff in 1923, 1932 and 1939.

After 1940 
Son of a Polish-born pawnbroker, Joseph Leopold Schultz (1900–91), lauded for promoting bomb-shelters pre-war, was Lord Mayor in 1942 and Sheriff for 1968. Sir Leo Schultz OBE "the Lion of Hull" led a Labour-run City from 1945 to 1979. He also fostered a Kindertransport child; a large bronze statue of Sir Leo later appeared at the Guildhall.

Lord Mayor in 1952 was AK Jacobs (see History of Jews in Kingston upon Hull#Businesses); and in 1958 and '59 Lawrie Science, brother of coroner Philip (see Professionals in Hull, below). In 1966 Marcus Segal was Sheriff, as was the cultured Dr. Lionel Rosen OBE in 1951, later Lord Mayor for 1972, and on the Board of Deputies of British Jews. Louis Pearlman was Lord Mayor in 1983.

Philip Bloom was Deputy Leader of Hull City Council in the 1980s.

Appointments to non-locals 
London trade-unionist Henry Solomons became Labour MP for Hull North in 1964 but died the following year. Not apparently connected to the resident community, Helen Suzman DBE, the anti-apartheid campaigner, was awarded Honorary Freedom of the City in 1987. Similarly, Labour's Baron Peter Mandelson, whose father was from a London Jewish family, was awarded in 2013 the ancient role of Steward of Hull, as his grandfather Herbert Morrison the Labour politician had been 1956–65.

Beyond Hull 
Moses Abrahams, born 1825 in Hull, lived after 1857 in Grimsby, as inaugural synagogue president, clothier, jeweller,

optician, property-owner, ship-broker, Councillor, and Mayor in 1901.

Theresa Science Russell, sister to Hull Lord Mayor Lawrie Science and Coroner Philip Science, was 1965 Lord Mayor of Newcastle; also Hull born and bred was solicitor and judge, Neville Goldrein CBE, Leader of Lancashire County Council 1977–81.

Professionals in Hull and area

Healthcare 
By the 1830s a Jewish professional class appeared. Travelling surgeon-dentist Simeon Mosely (see History of Jews in Kingston upon Hull#Early history) patented an artificial palate, L.J. Levison was a dentist at that time,  and Isaac Lyon a surgeon at Hull Infirmary. Polish-born Joel Farbstein was synagogue president and "corn doctor", son Henry a surgeon on Anlaby Road; grandson Lt Joel Scott Forbes died in France in 1917. Isaac Harris, Lewis Bergman, Izidore Hirschfield and the Bibbero brothers were dentists noted in the 1890s. German refugee dentists in the 1930s included Max Adler.

From 1939 GP Leslie Hardy wrote about rational theism and much else, and GP Dr. Seewald championed Handball. More recent GPs included community leader Carl Rosen, his wife Cynthia, synagogue president Solomon Lurie (descendant of the world's oldest-known family and the Rabbinic dynasty of Solomon Luria), his son Ralph, and Louis Jaffe.

Senior medics were German emigre chest physician Max Isserlin, director of Castle Hill Hospital (cousin to an important psychiatrist of the same name, whose daughter Beate was a Hull GP); and Philip Science, Hull City Coroner. Clive Aber was a well-known cardiologist.

Minister Samuel Simon sold spectacles in the 1820s, and Henry Franks was optician on Whitefriargate in 1842. Bush Opticians, still around Hull, began in Victorian jewellery days, whilst Sydney Burnley (also a pharmacist) and the Daniels brothers are more recent. Vinegrad, Winroope and Passman were pharmacists, as have been three Sugarmans.

Law 
Mayor William Henry Moss founded a firm of solicitors, as did Bethel's prominent son Joseph Jacobs (Jacobs and Dixon); and later Samuel Feldman and Maurice Gosschalk. Other Jewish practices were Lewensteins, Myer Wolff, and Rosen & (Benno) Pearlman. Lionel Rosen represented family of the lost trawler Gaul, along with synagogue president Max Gold, who also chaired Hull Kingston Rovers. Warren Winetroube, Leon Lurie and Ian Lanch are also recent senior solicitors.

Michael Rosenberg of Hull was a district judge; and Lorna Cole (wife of solicitor Carl Rosen, mother of Paul, eye-surgeon, and Sophie, solicitor and teacher) was the first female barrister on the North Eastern Circuit. Myrella Cohen from Manchester became Recorder of Hull in 1971, later a judge at the Old Bailey, retiring in 1995 as Britain's longest-serving woman judge, and longest-serving Jewish judge.

Other 
Architect Benjamin Septimus Jacobs (1851–1931), son of Bethel Jacobs (see History of Jews in Kingston upon Hull#Early history), designed many Hull buildings – the Yorkshire Penny Bank (now Café Nero) in Queen Victoria Square, as well as Linnaeus Street synagogue. Finestein, Sugarman, Deitch, and Feldman were more recent architects. Bob Rosner, a Hull Kindertransport child adopted by Councillor Leo Schultz (see Civic leaders, above), was involved with part of the design of the Humber Bridge project; the Bridge's chief architect Bernard Wex was the son of Julius Wex, a London lace merchant (of unknown background) who arrived in 1900 from Germany. Glasgow's Isi Metzstein designed Cottingham's award-winning student campus, The Lawns.

In living memory, Louis Seltzer, Billy Sugarman (see History of Jews in Kingston upon Hull#War service), Aubrey Gordon and Maurice Waxman were state-school headmasters in Hull. Sadofsky, Korklin, Field, and Harris are recalled as accountants. Goodman was a surveyor, Livingstone and Blank estate agents.

Professionals beyond Hull

Healthcare 
Amongst Hull-born doctors are antenatal-screening authority Prof. Howard Cuckle of Leeds, New York and Tel Aviv; and Prof. Stuart Rosen, cardiologist, of Imperial College London – son of GP parents, and brother to Jerusalem Rabbis Jonathan and Joseph. Hull-born cousins Paul and Emanuel Rosen are influential eye surgeons based in Oxford and Manchester.

Edward Levine was an academic oncologist in Manchester, described as brilliant and much-loved.

Leon Vinegrad was a Hull-born GP, and also a psychiatrist, years before hospital CEO Philip Sugarman. New York's visionary Rabbi Alan Miller, also a psychoanalyst, was born in Hull, son of Rabbi Louis Miller.

Rudolf Sprinz became Professor of Dental Anatomy at Edinburgh. Luci Daniels chaired the British Dietetic Association.

Law 
Simon Levine, brother to Dr. Edward Levine, manages global law firm DLA Piper. Son of Hull GP (and homeopath to royalty) Michael Bott, is international fraud expert Charles Bott QC. Prof. John Peysner, son of Osborne Street butcher Kopel Peysner, was head of Lincoln Law School. Mark Friend is an international commercial lawyer and authority on competition law. Dentist's son Adrian Flasher is a specialist prosecutor in international drug cases.

Israel Finestein QC (1921–2009), Deputy High Court Judge, was a leader and historian of British Jewry. Two of his Hull-born nephews also became judges – John Finestein, and Colin Lang (a Birmingham solicitor, and member of the Board of Deputies of British Jews). Israel Finestein's "home town" essay on the Jews of Hull is meticulously researched. He was president of the Mental Health Review Tribunal, the Board of Deputies of British Jews, and the Jewish Historical Society. The Leeds branch of the latter was founded by Hull-born Bernard Silver, who in 1948 helped arrange arms-smuggling in Palestine.

Other 
Dame Valerie Strachan DCB is the daughter of Hull chemist, B'nai B'rith stalwart, and City Councillor John Jonas Nicholls (Nickelsberg); she headed UK Customs & Excise 1993–2000, and was named a Jewish Care Woman of Distinction in 1999.

Jacob Grantham co-chairs the Civil Service Jewish Network.

Simon Winetroube is director of English at Curtin University, Australia.

Clifford Harry Barnett, born in Hull 1927 was an architect, RIBA Bronze Medallist in 1947, of the firm Gillinson Barnett & Partners, known for landmark modernist leisure and shopping centres.

Raymond Kauffman (1944-2008) became an award-winning hairdresser, stylist to Hollywood stars, Miss World contestants and the British Olympic team, returning to run several salons in the Hull area.

Science and technology 
Sir Bernhard Samuelson (1820–1905) was brought up in Hull in a wealthy converted merchant family, and educated at Skirlaugh. He married the daughter of Hull Mayor Henry Blundell; his brother Martin was a Hull shipbuilder and mayor (see History of Jews in Kingston upon Hull#Civic leaders). A major iron and steel industrialist of the era, and multi-talented champion for scientific and technical education, Bernhard was an MP for 30 years, a member of Gladstone's administration, Privy Counsellor, and a Fellow of the Royal Society.

Sydney Goldstein (1903–89) was born to the family of the Hull & East Riding Furnishing Co., Anlaby Road. A brilliant Cambridge mathematician, later professor at Manchester and Harvard, his contribution to aerodynamics and the Taylor–Goldstein equation brought Fellowship of the Royal Society age 33, the youngest since Michael Faraday.

Also from Hull is Malcolm Levitt, an expert in Nuclear Magnetic Resonance. After Oxford, MIT etc., he heads a Southampton team; he is another Fellow of the Royal Society. For doctors, see Professionals.

University of Hull 
Among continental emigres was Prof. Jacob Bronowski (1908–74), best known for the BBC's 1973 The Ascent of Man, who taught maths at University College Hull 1934–42, and lived in Cottingham. Another was economist Prof. Theodor Plaut of Hamburg, descendant of banking dynasties, who lectured at University College Hull 1933–1936; his son Gus, a pupil at Hymers College, became a noted London doctor and philanthropist, later in York. In the 1940s refugee Dr. Marcus Weinberger lectured at Hull, and later headed Mathematics at Canada's Operational Research and Analysis Establishment. Ludwig Lachmann, a brilliant emigre economist of the 1930s at LSE, went on to lecture in Hull in 1943. Bernhard Neumann AC FRS was born in Berlin; lecturer in mathematics at Hull 1946–8, he became a leading figure in group theory.

Raphael Powell (1904–65) was Head of Law at University College Hull 1937–49, later Professor of Roman Law at University College London.

The Chancellor of Hull University 1970–77 was Lord Cohen of Birkenhead, a dominant physician in the early NHS and associate of Nye Bevan; a friend in Liverpool of Hull-born Aby Furman, Henry Cohen was the first Jew and the first medic in the UK to hold a University Chancellor position.

Biochemist Prof. John Friend, born in Liverpool, was head of plant biology, science Pro-vice Chancellor at Hull University, and one of the signatories to the 1972 landmark environmentalist Blueprint for Survival. A founder of the Middle East Study Group at Hull University, and advocate of interfaith relations in Hull, he was a visiting professor at the Hebrew University of Jerusalem. His son, Hull's Richard Friend, is an ethnographer and environmental fieldworker in the Far East and academic at York University.

Harold Silver, born in Hull, became one of the 20th century's leading writers and thinkers on the history of education and the role of education policy in social change. First a postgraduate at Hull University, later at Cambridge and the University of London, he was also a poet, linguist, columnist and writer of children's stories. Jewish MP Louise Ellman studied sociology and history at Hull University. Allan Levy QC studied law at Hull, became a barrister specialising in family law and children's rights. He chaired the Pindown Inquiry. Jonathan Raban, travel writer, novelist and critic, studied literature and drama at Hull.

Prof. Raphael Cohen-Almagor DPhil is chair in Politics and founding director of the Middle East Study Group at the University of Hull. A visiting professor at leading universities in many countries, he is a widely published author on democracy and human rights, peace and liberty.

Hull-born Valerie Sanders is Professor of English at the university, an expert particularly on Victorian women's writing and family life. Professor Sanders has been head of the English Department, director of the Graduate School, and featured on the BBC.

Dr Giles Davidson, descendant of the Hull Davidovitz/Davidson family, was a key executive in the founding of the Hull's The Deep aquarium and the Hull York Medical School, and Principal of the university's Scarborough Campus. He is currently leading the Ark-National Flood Resilience Centre project at the university.

Dr. Judith Cohen heads the Hull Health Trials Unit.

Literature and publishing 
Novelist Lionel Davidson, born to a Polish tailor in Hull, started writing at The Spectator. His neglected but prize-winning spy fiction, such as Kolymsky Heights, is compared to Fleming, Le Carré and Maclean. Lionel's sister Edie (Edith Noble) became prominent internationally in Jewish women's organisations  – see Jewish leadership below.

Distinguished national newspaper editor and publisher Mark Goulden, born in Bristol, ran regional papers as a noteworthy figure in Hull; mixing both with the Jewish community and figures like Amy Johnson, the flier, he went on in 1933 to interview Albert Einstein, warning the world about Hitler.

Hull-born Simon Clyne (d.2011) was a Fleet Street picture editor; as a centenarian he was the oldest Briton to emigrate to Israel.

Brought up in Hull were Norma Levinson, daughter of Rev. Levinson, who published fiction, including the televised The Room Upstairs; and her sister Deidre, also an accomplished writer.

Domini Highsmith a.k.a. Domini Wiles (1942–2003) was a Yorkshire-born Jewish novelist and local historian in Beverley, near Hull. Resident in Beverley too was collector Malcolm Shields (b.Schultz), a Hull businessman, he wrote about evacuation, and latterly with his partner about great local artists.

Joyce Kennedy née Harris (1933–2021), born in Hull, a GP and anaesthetist in Salford, was a writer on classical music who collaborated with her husband Michael, a veteran Telegraph music critic. She was joint editor of the multi-edition Oxford Dictionary of Music (1980), and authored books on opera.

Art and design 
Baron Duveen of Millbank, Joseph (1869–1939), born in Hull, was the world's greatest art-dealer. His Dutch Sephardi father had married the daughter of a Carr Lane antiques dealer, and opened London and New York fine art and porcelain showrooms. Duveen junior bought art from UK aristocrats and sold to Hearst, Morgan, Rockefeller, Getty, Frick etc., donating generously to Hull's Guildhall and Ferens galleries, the British Museum and The Tate. He was made a Freeman of the City of Hull in 1929.

Ellis Abraham Davidson, a Victorian pioneer of art-and-design teaching, and a prolific writer and lecturer on science, nature and religion, was Hull born-and-bred; as was Pat Albeck, textile designer and "Queen of the Tea Towels". Sir Jacobs Behrens, who lived in Hull c.1834, founded Manchester's now oldest textile company; and Hull cabinet-maker Louis Lebus, and son Harris (1852–1907) moved to London, to open the world's largest furniture factory, famed for arts-and-crafts.

Sport 
Marcus Bibbero (1837–1910), brought up in Hull, was a world-class swimmer and cross-channel coach, who promoted life-saving and municipal baths. He first appears in British newspapers for assaulting reporters who investigated his Pepper's Ghost exhibition in Hull, a charge of which he was acquitted. Later styling himself as Professor or Marquis Bibbero, he became an international sensation, for feats such as swimming manacled from Brooklyn to Manhattan.

Handball was first introduced from Europe after the war, by emigre GP Dr. L.M. Seewald, who ran a league in Hull, and wrote the first rule book in English.

Born and bred in Hull was Bombardier Arthur Myerthall, who boxed as cruiserweight "Gunner Martell", winning over 50 fights in the region.

Louis Harris MBE (1896–75) played as a three-quarter for Hull Kingston Rovers, with 255 appearances, and was later the club's coach. Of many Jewish Rugby League enthusiasts, a few like Harris became directors at one of the two Hull clubs. South African Wilf Rosenberg "the flying dentist" played 86 times for Hull FC 1961–1963, as well for Leeds. Manny Cussins, born in Hull 1905, a nephew of Lloyd Rakusen, became a furniture magnate and philanthropist in Leeds, and chaired Leeds United F.C. 1972–83.

Reports from Hull City matches on BBC Radio Humberside were regularly given by Elliot Oppel in the 1960s and 70s.

Martin Schultz played cricket for Hull CC in the 1970s, for Great Britain in the 1981 and 1985' Maccabiah Games, and still plays in London.

Entertainment 
Joseph Levy of Hull, who died in 1899, was a travelling circus manager.

Eccentric variety artist Harry Seltzer left Hull, to appear with Trinder, Formby, Flanagan, Keaton, Chaplin etc., and become King of the Grand Order of Water Rats.

Jerry Gold (father to Max, see Professionals in Hull) was a comedian, popular in Hull, who toured the Northern Circuit and beyond c.1928–46. Local Jewish entertainers of the early and mid-twentieth century in Hull ranged from dancing barbers Joe Hyman and Moishe Krantz, to soprano Lena Hyman, and hypnotist Walter Abrahams.

Mira Bibbero Johnson of Hull (family of Marcus, see Sport) was a Northern Circuit performer, on the BBC in the 1920s with skits and impersonations, often at the piano, who later opened the city's House of Mirelle. Celia Martell (Myerthall) played piano on the BBC around 1937–40, known now for her piano-accordion arrangement of Teddy Bears' picnic.

In 1870, a Monsieur Henri Hartog was conductor in Hull of the Yorkshire Amateur Concerts. From that year on, for a decade, blind 8-year old violinist Isaac Isenberg, a Hebrew School pupil in Hull, played, in the Public Rooms on Jarrett Street, on Osborne Street, and elsewhere, and was dubbed "the blind Paganini".

Later, the jazz and big band era had many Jewish contributors, including in Hull. Well-known local dance-band leaders were occasionally broadcast by the BBC – Louis Goulden, his protege Louis Gold, and Maxwell Daniels. Maxwell's brother Benny was a pre-war saxophonist with the great Jack Hylton, and post-war bandleader based in Glasgow, who originally played with third brother Jack, saxophonist and session musician.

Harry Pitch, born in Hull in 1925, brought up in London, became the leading British harmonica player for film and TV music, including the series Last of the Summer Wine.

Basil Kirchin, son of band leader Ivor Kirchin who played in Hull, was an English drummer and influential composer of avant-garde electronic and experimental music; he settled in Hull, where his father later joined him.

John Bentley was bass guitarist for Squeeze.

Dame Maureen Lipman DBE, is the daughter of Maurice "Mush" Lipman, tailor and naval outfitter on Monument Bridge in Hull's city centre, and president of Park Street synagogue. She married playwright Jack Rosenthal; her career in theatre, film, writing and TV also featured 1980s BT adverts as Beattie, a Jewish mother.

Elliot Oppel was a Hull maths teacher, regional sports reporter, and regular presenter of Top Town Quiz on BBC Radio Humberside. A writer and local historian, he also made radio broadcasts for the BBC on Jewish topics. Media producer Jonathan Levy broadcasts on Beverley FM.

Hull's Beryl Cobden married Leonard Steinberg, later Baron Steinberg, the Stanley Leisure bookmaking and casino magnate; Lady Steinberg is patron of such charities as the Manchester Jewish Federation and UK Jewish film.

Jewish leadership 
Hull's Israel Finestein QC was, amongst many roles, President of the Board of Deputies of British Jews (see Law, above). Edith Noble (born Davidson in Hull in 1910) became President of the League of Jewish Women, Life President of The Alliance of Jewish Women and their Organisations (AJWO) and Vice President of the International Council of Jewish Women.

Non-Jews 
Sir Mark Sykes, MP for Central Hull, and Yorkshire landowner, was a passionate Zionist and key architect behind the Balfour Declaration.

Hull-born Sister Agnes Walsh (d.1993) sheltered and helped save a Jewish family from deportation, while at a convent in southern France during the Second World War; she is honoured in Israel as Righteous Among the Nations.

Alex J. Kay, born in East Hull, is one of the world's leading scholars of the Holocaust era.

Nick Evans is a historian at Hull University, an expert on migrant diasporas, who has researched the Jews of Hull.

War service 
see Main Article History of Jews in Kingston upon Hull

Business and entrepreneurship 
see Main Article History of Jews in Kingston upon Hull

Miscellaneous 
Dr Samuel Kuttner (d.1908) was a German-born Manchester shop-keeper, who became in 1840 a Protestant Minister, but converted to Catholicism in 1852. Claiming to have been chaplain to the Anglican Bishop of Jerusalem, as a travelling lecturer with an unlikely string of qualifications, he was exposed for his frauds. He married in Hull, and in 1859 was a bankrupted shipping agent at no. 24 Humber Dock-walls; his great-granddaughter was the pianist Marguerite Wolff.

References

Lists of British Jews